This page provides the summaries of the CONCACAF Third Round matches for 2014 FIFA World Cup qualification.

Format
The third round saw the teams ranked 1–6 joined by the 6 group winners from the second round. These teams were drawn into three groups of four teams, at the World Cup Preliminary Draw at the Marina da Glória in Rio de Janeiro, Brazil on 30 July 2011.

The matches were played from 8 June to 16 October 2012. The top two teams from each group advanced to the fourth round.

Seeding
The draw for the third round was held before the second round matches were played, so only the six teams with byes to the round were known at the time of the draw.  Teams were seeded into three pots, with Pot 1 containing the top 3 seeds, Pot 2 seeds 4 to 6, and Pot 3 the 6 (unknown) group winners from the second round (designated Winner A to Winner F).  Each third round group will contain one team from Pot 1, one team from Pot 2 and two teams from Pot 3.

Note: The identity of teams in Pot 3 (second round winners) were not known at the time of the draw.

Groups

Group A

Group B

Group C

Goalscorers
There were 100 goals scored in 36 games, for an average of 2.78 goals per game.

6 goals
 Álvaro Saborío

5 goals

 Carlos Ruiz
 Jerry Bengtson
 Clint Dempsey

3 goals

 Osael Romero
 Carlo Costly
 Javier Hernández
 Blas Pérez

2 goals

 Peter Byers
 Randall Brenes
 Joel Campbell
 Isidro Gutiérrez
 Dwight Pezzarossi
 Trayon Bobb
 Mario Martínez
 Demar Phillips
 Dane Richards
 Luton Shelton
 Oribe Peralta
 Carlos Salcido
 Jesús Zavala
 Nelson Barahona
 Carlos Bocanegra
 Herculez Gomez
 Eddie Johnson

1 goal

 Dexter Blackstock
 Quinton Griffith
 Dwayne De Rosario
 David Edgar
 Iain Hume
 Will Johnson
 Olivier Occean
 Tosaint Ricketts
 Christian Bolaños
 Celso Borges
 José Miguel Cubero
 Cristian Gamboa
 Alberto Gómez
 Jaime Alas
 Rafael Burgos
 Alfredo Pacheco
 Carlos Figueroa
 Marco Pappa
 Chris Nurse
 Gregory Richardson
 Víctor Bernárdez
 Marvin Chávez
 Rodolph Austin
 Ryan Johnson
 Nyron Nosworthy
 Giovani dos Santos
 Andrés Guardado
 Héctor Moreno
 Ángel Reyna
 Rolando Blackburn

1 own goal
 Charles Pollard (against Mexico)
 J. P. Rodrigues (against Mexico)
 Héctor Moreno (against Guyana)

Notes

References

External links
Results and schedule (FIFA.com version)
Results and schedule (CONCACAF.com version)

3
Qual3
qualification 1